Mongla may refer to:
Mong La town in Shan State, Burma
Mong La Township
Mongla Upazila, in Khulna Division, Bangladesh
 Mongla Export Processing Zone, an economic zone in Bangladesh 
Port of Mongla in Bangladesh